Shiraz Solar Power Plant is a concentrating solar power type pilot power station situated near Shiraz, Iran. It became operational in 2008. The plant uses concentrating parabolic mirrors to focus a beam of light on a tower making steam for electricity generating turbines.  It has a capacity of 250 kilowatt (kW). It is a project aimed at developing technologies needed for larger solar power plants, and is currently being upgraded to 500 kW capacity.

See also

Solar power in Iran
Yazd solar power station
List of power stations in Iran
International rankings of Iran

References

External links
Renewable energy organization of Iran

Solar power stations in Iran
Buildings and structures in Fars Province